The Universidad de Londres (Spanish, "University of London") is a university in Mexico with multiple campuses in the Colonia Roma and Doctores neighborhoods of Mexico City, and Queretaro City, Mexico.

References

Universities in Mexico City
Colonia Roma